The Royal Palace of the Oba of Benin is notable as the home of the Oba of Benin and other royals.

The palace, built by Oba Ewedo (1255AD – 1280AD), is located at the heart of ancient City of Benin. It was rebuilt by Oba Eweka II (1914–1932) after the original building was destroyed during the 1897 war with the British. The palace was declared a UNESCO Listed Heritage Site in 1999.

The Royal Palace of Oba of Benin is a celebration and preservation of the rich Benin culture. Most of the visitors to the palace are curators, archaeologists or historians.

See also 
 Oba Of Benin
 Benin Kingdom
 Benin City

References 

Benin City
Tourist attractions in Nigeria
Rebuilt buildings and structures in Nigeria